A.S.D. Boca Ascesa Val Liona is an Italian association football club located in Val Liona, Veneto. It currently plays in Eccellenza.

History 
The origins of football in Grancona go back to 1969 when was founded A.C. Grancona Calcio that was refounded in 2005 as A.S.D. Nuovo Calcio Grancona.

In summer 2012 after the acquisition of the sports title of Eccellenza club Nuova Valdagno, based in Valdagno, the club changed its name to Boca Ascesa Val Liona.

Colors and badge 
Its colors are black and orange
.

References

External links

Football clubs in Italy
Football clubs in Veneto
Association football clubs established in 1969
1969 establishments in Italy

fr:Associazione Calcio Nuova Valdagno
it:Associazione Calcio Nuova Valdagno
pt:Associazione Calcio Nuova Valdagno
simple:A.C. Nuova Valdagno